In subcultural and fictional uses, a mundane is a person who does not belong to a particular group, according to the members of that group; the implication is that such persons, lacking imagination, are concerned solely with the mundane: the quotidian and ordinary.  The term first came into use in science fiction fandom to refer, sometimes deprecatingly, to non-fans; this use of the term antedates 1955.

Etymology
Mundane came originally from the Latin mundus, meaning ordinary and worldly as opposed to spiritual, and has been in use in English since the 15th century.

In popular culture
Some western cultural examples:
 In Cassandra Clare's book series The Mortal Instruments and The Infernal Devices, humans who were not Shadowhunters nor Downworlders were referred to as "mundanes".
 In fantasy literature the term is sometimes used to apply to non-magical people or the non-magical society. It is used in Piers Anthony's Xanth novels and Bill Willingham's comic book series Fables (often shortened to "mundies" in the latter).
 In furry fandom, it is used to describe non-furries, or "humans".
 In historical reenactment groups such as the Society for Creative Anachronism (which originated in science fiction fandom):
'Mundanes', sometimes shortened to just "'danes" (not to be confused with people of Danish descent), is also a term for normal everyday clothes, as opposed to those dressed in historical garb.
Similarly, one's "mundane" name is the legal name one goes by in the outside world.
Some participants classify all non-participants as "mundanes".
 In science fiction fandom, some fans classify all non-fans as "mundanes."
 In text-based online role-playing games, the term is commonly used to refer to the player as opposed to their character, typically shortened to "mun".
 In the science fiction television series Babylon 5, telepathic humans (especially Psi Corps members) classify all non-telepathic humans as "mundanes".  The classification is employed mainly, but not solely, by telepathic characters who have telepath-supremacist ideologies (such ideologies being one of the issues dealt with by the series), and was deliberately chosen to mirror the classification in science fiction fandom.
 In the scope of the software communities of free and open-source software some proponents  of the respective movements classify those that do not know enough about their views as "mundanes".
 In Vampire lifestyle circles the word "mundane" means "non-sanguinarian", although some consider it derogatory.
Mundane science fiction is science fiction that does not make use of interstellar travel or other common tropes of the genre.

See also 
 Muggle
 Plain vanilla
 Populism
 Reactionary
 Reform movement
 Revival movement
 Underground culture

References 

Science fiction terminology
Pejorative terms for people